William Kendall may refer to:
William Kendall (actor) (1903–1984), British actor, appeared in The Two Faces of Dr. Jekyll
William Kendall (cricketer) (born 1973), English cricketer
William Sergeant Kendall (1869–1938), American painter
William Kendall (swimmer) (1916–2004), Australian swimmer
William Kendall (burgess 1657) (1621–1686), Virginia colonial politician, Speaker of the Virginia House of Burgesses
William Kendall (burgess 1688) (1659–1696), his son, Virginia colonial politician, Member of the Virginia House of Burgesses
Bill Kendall (ice hockey) (1910–1996), Canadian hockey player
Bill Kendall (trade unionist) (1923–2000), British trade union leader
William Kendall, character in The $5,000,000 Counterfeiting Plot
William M. Kendall (1856–1941), American architect
William W. Kendall (1839–1920), Medal of Honor recipient of the American Civil War

See also
William Kendell (1851–1922), Australian politician